A list of science fiction films released in the 1950s. These films include core elements of science fiction, but can cross into other genres. They have been released to a cinema audience by the commercial film industry and are widely distributed with reviews by reputable critics.

This period is sometimes described as the 'classic' era of science fiction theater. Much of the production was in a low-budget form, targeted at a teenage audience. Many were formulaic, gimmicky, comic-book-style films. They drew upon political themes or public concerns of the day, including depersonalization, infiltration, or fear of nuclear weapons. Invasion was a common theme, as were various threats to humanity.

Approximately 192 science fiction films were made in the decade. Three of the films from this decade, Destination Moon (1950), The War of the Worlds (1953) and 20,000 Leagues Under the Sea (1954) won Academy Awards, while The Incredible Shrinking Man (1957) won a Hugo Award.

List

See also
 History of science fiction films

Notes

References

Lists of 1950s films by genre
1950s